Mohamad Rihanieh (born 1 January 2001) is a Syrian professional footballer who plays as a midfielder for Emirati club Hatta and the Syria national team.

International goals

Syria U23

Syria

Honours

International
Syria U23
WAFF U-23 Championship: 
 Third place: 2022
 Best scorer: 2022

References

External links
 
 

2001 births
Living people
Syrian footballers
Syria international footballers
Association football midfielders
Syrian Premier League players
Al-Ittihad Aleppo players